Kiuchi Brewery (木内酒造) is a brewery in Naka, Ibaraki Prefecture, Japan. It was established in 1823 by village headman Kiuchi Gihei as a sake and shochu producer.  

Craft beer production began in 1996 after a change in Japanese law governing micro brewing. A number of Kiuchi's products seek to combine European beer-making technology with traditional Japanese brewing techniques; for example, its XH Hitachino Nest Beer is matured in shochu casks.

Products

Hitachino Nest Beer
Amber Ale
Espresso Stout
Japanese Classic Ale (an India Pale Ale)
Lacto Sweet Stout
New Year Celebration Ale (a spiced ale)
Pale Ale
Real Ginger Ale (a ginger flavoured ale)
Red Rice Ale
White Ale
Weizen
XH (a Belgian strong ale)
Dai Dai (Orange IPA)
Yuzu Lager

Sake
Gekkakow
Kurakagami
Kurahibiki
Kurashizuku
Asamurasaki
Taruzake

Shochu
Kiuchi

See also
 Beer in Japan

External links
Kiuchi Brewery official site
Beer in Japan - Making beer at the Kiuchi Brewery, Ibaraki

Companies established in 1823
Beer in Japan
Companies based in Ibaraki Prefecture
Food and drink companies established in 1823
Naka, Ibaraki